Events from the year 1342 in the Kingdom of Scotland.

Incumbents
Monarch – David II

Events
 30 March — Alexander Ramsay of Dalhousie captured Roxburgh Castle.
 Scots made a strenuous attempt to capture Lochmaben Castle, but were repulsed.

Births

Deaths
 Alexander Ramsay of Dalhousie, died of starvation while a prisoner of William Douglas, Lord of Liddesdale in Hermitage Castle. 
 William Bullock,  died of starvation and exposure while a prisoner in Lochindorb Castle.

See also

 Timeline of Scottish history

References

 
Years of the 14th century in Scotland
Wars of Scottish Independence